Chondropyga dorsalis is a large Australian beetle commonly known as the cowboy beetle.

Description
The cowboy beetle grows to 20–25 mm (0.8–1 in) long with females generally slightly larger than males. It has a yellow-brown colouration and when in flight produce a loud buzzing noise which creates the illusion of a large wasp. It also does this when it feels threatened.

Distribution and habitat
It is found in south eastern Australia - throughout Victoria, New South Wales and part of Queensland. Adults feed on nectar while larvae live in rotten wood. They live in woodlands, dry sclerophyll forests and residential gardens.

Life cycle
Eggs are laid in damp locations in or around rotting logs. Once hatched, the larvae feed on the rotting timber until ready to pupate. They construct their pupae from mud and rotting debris. Adults emerge in summer. Adults feed on nectar-bearing shrubs and trees.

References

Cetoniinae
Beetles of Australia
Beetles described in 1805
Taxa named by Edward Donovan